Bon Bini Holland 2 is a 2018 Dutch comedy film produced by Maarten Swart and directed by Jon Karthaus. Starring co-writer Jandino Asporaat who plays five different characters in the film, and Liliana de Vries. The film premiered in Dutch theaters nationwide on 13 December 2018. The film is a sequel to Bon Bini Holland. The film grossed more than $7 million and was the fourth-most visited Dutch film of 2019. It also won the Audience Award at the 2020 Netherlands Film Festival.

Awards
 Golden and Platina Film, Netherlands: 1
 Golden Film: 2018
 Platina Film: 2018
 Netherlands Film Festival: 1
 Audience Award: 2019

See also 
 Bon Bini Holland (2015 film)
 Bon Bini Holland 3 (2022 film)

References

External links 
 Bon Bini Holland Official website
 

2018 films
2010s Dutch-language films
2018 comedy films
Dutch comedy films
Films directed by Jon Karthaus
Dutch sequel films